The 1927 Duke Blue Devils football team was an American football team that represented Duke University as an independent during the 1927 college football season. In its second season under head coach James DeHart, the team compiled a 4–5 record and outscored opponents by a total of 215 to 117. C. C. Bennett was the team captain.

Schedule

References

Duke
Duke Blue Devils football seasons
Duke Blue Devils football